The Last Shift is a 2020 American comedy-drama film written and directed by Andrew Cohn in his narrative directorial debut. It stars Richard Jenkins,  Shane Paul McGhie, Da'Vine Joy Randolph, Birgundi Baker, Allison Tolman and Ed O'Neill.

Cast
 Richard Jenkins as Stanley
 Shane Paul McGhie as Jevon
 Da'Vine Joy Randolph as Shazz
 Birgundi Baker as Sidney
 Allison Tolman as Mrs. Kelly
 Ed O'Neill as Dale
 Alex Stein as Rich

Production
In July 2019, it was announced Richard Jenkins, Shane Paul McGhie, Da'Vine Joy Randolph, Birgundi Baker, Allison Tolman and Ed O'Neill had joined the cast of the film, with Andrew Cohn directing from a screenplay he wrote.

Release
It had its world premiere at the Sundance Film Festival on January 27, 2020. In September 2020, Sony Pictures Releasing acquired distribution rights to the film and set it for a September 25, 2020, release.

Reception
The website's critics consensus reads: "The Last Shift doesn't quite reach the potential of its premise, however a powerful performance from Richard Jenkins makes it worth the watch." Metacritic reports a score of 58 out of 100 based on 14 critic reviews, indicating "generally favorable reviews".

References

External links
 
 

2020 films
American comedy-drama films
Films scored by Mark Orton
Stage 6 Films films
2020 comedy-drama films
2020s English-language films
2020s American films